Below are the rosters for the 1985 FIFA World Youth Championship tournament in Soviet Union. Those marked in bold went on to earn full international caps.

Group A

Head coach: Boris Angelov

Head coach: Luis Marroquín

Head coach: Bertalan Bicskei

Head coach: Mrad Mahjoub

Group B

Head coach: Gilson Nunes

Head coach: Liam Tuohy

Head coach:  Oswaldo Sempaio

Head coach: Jesús Pereda

Group C

Head coach:  Jim Shoulder

Head coach:  Bob Bearpark

 Player 18 is also called Larry or Harry Houle in some sources.

Head coach:  Paul Hamilton

Head coach: Sergei Mosyagin

Group D

Head coach: Zhang Zhicheng

Head coach: Dave Sexton

 Only 16 players in England squad. Goalkeeper (N°1) Tim Flowers 03/02/1967 Wolverhampton Wanderers England and forward (N°11) Ian Marshall 20/03/1966 Everton England were cut from the final squad and not replaced.

Head coach: Jesús del Muro

Head coach: Salvador Breglia

References 

 FIFA pages on 1985 World Youth Cup

Fifa World Youth Championship Squads, 1985
FIFA U-20 World Cup squads